Piloni is a village in Tuscany, central Italy,  administratively a frazione of the comune of Roccastrada, province of Grosseto. At the time of the 2001 census its population amounted to 152.

Piloni is about 45 km from Grosseto and 10 km from Roccastrada, and it is situated in the heart of La Pietra and Farma nature reserves.

Main sights 
 Santa Maria delle Grazie (19th century), main parish church of the village

References

Bibliography 
 Aldo Mazzolai, Guida della Maremma. Percorsi tra arte e natura, Le Lettere, Florence, 1997.

See also 
 Montemassi
 Ribolla
 Roccatederighi
 Sassofortino
 Sticciano
 Torniella

Frazioni of Roccastrada